The 2021–22 Northeastern Huskies Men's ice hockey season was the 90th season of play for the program. They represented Northeastern University in the 2021–22 NCAA Division I men's ice hockey season and for the 38th season in the Hockey East conference. The Huskies were coached by Jerry Keefe, in his first season, and played their home games at Matthews Arena.

Season
In the offseason, Northeaster reshuffled its athletic department with former hockey head coach Jim Madigan being promoted to Athletic Director and former assistant Jerry Keefe taking his place at the helm of the program. The biggest addition to the team, however, was new starting goaltender Devon Levi. Levi had sat out the previous season on account of COVID-19 but remained enrolled throughout his freshman year. He kicked off his college career with a pair of shutouts and quickly acclimated to the pace of play and volume of shots.

After a bit of a fitful start, Levi settled down and produced a tremendous stretch of goaltending. Over the course of fourteen games beginning in late-October and continuing until early-January, Levi didn't allow more than two goals in any match. Northeastern went 12–1–1 in that time with Levi racking up 5 shutouts and posting a mind-boggling .969 save percentage. The Huskies defense wasn't particularly porous, allowing fewer than 28 shots against in those games, but Levi's astounding performance had him chasing history for the all-time record.

Unfortunately, Northeastern wasn't playing nearly as well on the other end of the ice. The Huskies were relatively weak in the goal-scoring department with the exception of Aidan Mcdonough. The team ended up relying on the junior winger for more than a quarter of its goals and was hard pressed to put together much in the way of offense when he was off the ice.

In February 2021, both the men's and women's programs were selected to participate in the 2021 Winter Universiade. Concerns about COVID-19 caused postponements to be announced in August but new dates were set by November. By the end of the month, however, fears over the Omicron variant forced the Swiss government to introduce new travel restrictions which forced the cancellation of the games.

Despite the scoring woes, Northeastern was in a prime position to make the NCAA tournament when the second half of the season began. However, after a couple of easy tilts against Long Island, Levi's performance began to break down. In a 4-game stretch, he allowed 15 goals and put the team precarious close to dropping below the cutoff line for the NCAA tournament. To make matters worse for the Huskies, Levi departed afterwards to join Team Canada at the 2022 Winter Olympics. His replacement, T. J. Semptimphelter, was a true freshman that had yet to play a single minute of college hockey and he was thrown in against #14 Massachusetts Lowell. Semptimphelter responded with an admirable, although losing, performance and then produced several solid games over the next four weeks.

Upon Levi's return in late-February, Northeastern had improved its position during his absence. Although the team lost in the Beanpot final, the Huskies were ranked in the top-15 and had an outside chance at a conference title. Levi announced his return with a 60-save victory over Connecticut and followed that up with a 40-save performance the following night. After a stunning loss to lowly Vermont, the team needed quite a bit of help as it was 5 points behind Massachusetts for 1st-place. In a stunning turn of events, the Minutemen lost both games on the final weekend of the regular season in regulation while Northeastern shut down Merrimack to vault to top of the standings and capture the program's first ever league title.

Postseason
When the Huskies began postseason play they did so knowing that the only guarantee of making the NCAA tournament was a conference championship. With anything less, they would have to hope that other conferences would not be won by underdog teams. Boston College was the first opponent for Northeastern and everything seemed to be going their way in the first two periods. NU entered the final frame with a 3–0 lead and was ready to cruise to an easy victory but the Eagles had other ideas. BC's offense went on the attack and fired 25 shots on goal in the last 20 minutes, getting two goals in just over 16 minutes, but the defense was able to hold over the last 3:48 and prevent Boston College from forcing overtime. The narrow victory was a portent of things to come, however, and the team was again widely outshot in the semifinal. Connecticut's defense was ready for the Huskies and limited Northeastern to a single goal, knocking NU out with a 1–4 loss. The defeat put Northeastern on the brink of disaster since the team was dropped down to #14 in the Pairwise rankings. That meant that the Huskies would miss out on the tournament if more than one lower-seeded teams won their conference championship games. After Harvard won the ECAC Hockey crown, the Huskies were put on the chopping block. Both the Hockey East and CCHA title games went into overtime but, fortunately for Northeastern, both were won by higher-seeded teams and the Huskies ended up receiving the last at-large bid into the tournament.

Northeastern was set opposite Western Michigan, one of the top offenses in the nation. With their work cut out for them, the 4th-seeded Huskies came out skating hard and tried to outplay the Broncos. Both teams raced up and down the ice for most of the game and though WMU got an early lead, Levi made sure they weren't able to build on it. Northeastern seemed to grow stronger as the match wore on and fired more and more pucks on goal. With less than 4 minutes remaining in the game, Mcdonough finally broke through with his 25th goal of the year, tying the score. Less than 90 seconds into overtime, Levi made a poor clearing attempt from behind his net. The puck was knocked down by a Bronco who then skated around the cage and tried to score on an empty net. Levi raced to get back into position and initially it appeared that he was just able to stop the goal. However, replay showed that the puck had completely crossed the goal line prior to his diving attempt and the game went to Western Michigan.

Levi ended up finishing the season just .004 below the all-time record for save percentage in a single season. However, because he played in at least 30 games during the season, Levi broke the record for career save percentage with .952. Retaining the record will depend on his performance in future seasons.

Departures

Recruiting

Roster
As of August 12, 2021.

Standings

Schedule and results

|-
!colspan=12 style=";" | Regular season

|-
!colspan=12 ! style=""; | 

|-
!colspan=12 style=";" | Regular season

|-
!colspan=12 ! style=""; | 

|-
!colspan=12 style=";" | 

|-
!colspan=12 style=";" |

Scoring statistics

Goaltending statistics

Rankings

Note: USCHO did not release a poll in week 24.

Awards and honors

Players drafted into the NHL

2022 NHL Entry Draft

† incoming freshman

References

2021–22
Northeastern
Northeastern
Northeastern
Northeastern